Essay d'analyse sur les jeux de hazard ("Analysis of games of chance") is a book on combinatorics and mathematical probability written by Pierre Remond de Montmort and published in 1708. The work applied ideas from combinatorics and probability to analyse various games of chances popular during the time. This book was mainly influenced by Huygens' treatise De ratiociniis in ludo aleae and the knowledge of the fact that Jakob Bernoulli had written an unfinished work in probability. The work was intended to re-create the yet unpublished work of Jakob Bernoulli called Ars Conjectandi. The work greatly influenced the thinking of Montmort's contemporary, Abraham De Moivre.

Montmort collaborated with Nicolaus(I) Bernoulli in a fascinating correspondence which began in 1710. They discussed many topics, particularly the probability questions that arose from Montmort's book. A second edition of the book was published in 1714, a year after the publication of Ars Conjectandi, published eight years after the Jakob's death. The second edition contained many new material and contained correspondences between the author and the Bernoullis, Niklaus and John, and is more than twice as long as the first edition. There are five sections: (1) A Treatise on Combinations; (2) Problems on Games of Chance; (3) This is called "Problem on Quinquenove:" (4) Various Problems; and (5) Correspondence. The second section studies the card games: Pharaon, Lansquenet, Treize, Bassette, Piquet, Triomphe, L'Ombre, Brelan, Imperial and Quinze. The third section examines games played with dice: Quinquenove, Hazard, Esperance, TricTrac, Trois Dez, Rafle, Trois Rafles, and Noyaux. The fourth section solves various problems including Huygens problems from De Ratiociniis in Ludo Aleae. The section ends giving four unsolved problems. The fifth section contains Montmort's correspondence with Nicolaus(I) Bernoulli where Petersberg and Waldegrave problems are introduced.

References

Sources

1708 books
Mathematics papers
1708 in science
Probability books